
Człuchów County is a unit of territorial administration and local government (powiat) in Pomeranian Voivodeship, northern Poland. It came into being on January 1, 1999, as a result of the Polish local government reforms passed in 1998.

As of 2019 its total population is 56,225, out of which the population of Człuchów is 13,649, that of Czarne is 5,932, that of Debrzno is 5,096, and the rural population is 30,924.

Człuchów County on a map of the counties of Pomeranian Voivodeship

Człuchów County is bordered by Bytów County to the north, Chojnice County to the east, Sępólno County to the south, Złotów County to the south-west and Szczecinek County to the west.

Administrative division 
The county is subdivided into seven gminas (one urban, two urban-rural and four rural). These are listed in the following table, in descending order of population.

County affiliation 
In the years 1945–1999, the area of the Człuchów county exceptionally frequently changed its administrative affiliation:

 1945-1946 was subordinated to Bydgoszcz
 1946-1950 was subordinated to Szczecin
 1950-1975 was subordinated to Koszalin
 1975-1998 was subordinated to Słupsk
 from 1999 was subordinated to Gdańsk

External links

References

 
Land counties of Pomeranian Voivodeship